The 2001 BC Lions finished in third place in the West Division with an 8–10 record. They appeared in the West-Semi Final.

Offseason

CFL Draft

Preseason

Regular season

Season standings

Season schedule

Awards and records
Barrin Simpson, Outstanding Rookie
Barrin Simpson, Norm Fieldgate Trophy

2001 CFL All-Stars

Western Division All-Star Selections

Playoffs

East Semi-Final

References

BC Lions seasons
Bc Lions Season, 2001
2001 in British Columbia